The European Heritage Heads Forum (EHHF) is an informal professional and expert network that brings together the heads of the European state heritage authorities (built heritage, landscapes, archaeology, etc.) to share knowledge and ideas and promote consistency in the management of the historic environment in the 21st century. The heads are mostly the directors-general of the departments in charge of immovable heritage within the national relevant ministries (Ministry of Culture, Environment, etc.).

Discussion centres on emerging trends, political engagement, European legislation and the scope of international heritage protection and how these affect national heritage policies and impact upon historic monuments, sites and urban centres. The Council of Europe, the European Commission, as well as the representatives of the civil society are associated with the activities of the EHHF by attending the annual meetings and encouraging the impact assessment of the cultural heritage sector at EU level. The EHHF acts as an advocate for heritage and produces strong statements on specific issues to support common concerns.

History 
A European Heritage Summit was first organised in London on 26–28 April 2006 by Dr. Simon Thurley, former Chief Executive Officer of English Heritage. The mission of the Summit was to gather for the first time the European heritage leaders who had the opportunity to exchange their experience and initiate common actions. It was attended by 23 European states which agreed in the Final Statement to continue to meet annually as a forum of European heritage heads, known as the “European Heritage Heads Forum”. The following EHHF annual meetings have been successively hosted by different countries.

In May 2014, the EHHF annual meeting was attended by a record of 26 European states.

The EHHF Troika 
The steering committee of the EHHF is a Troika composed of the head, or heads, of heritage of the country which hosted the annual meeting in the previous year and the heads of the countries which will host the subsequent two meetings. Troika meetings are chaired by the host of the next annual meeting. Future hosting countries are chosen by general agreement at the annual meeting.

The EHHF Secretariat 
The EHHF Secretariat reports to the Troika and is responsible for organising the annual meetings, circulating information to EHHF members, following-up the actions agreed by the EHHF, maintaining the EHHF website and upholding the original purpose for the informal meeting of the heads of the European heritage agencies to: 
 Exchange experience, ideas and good practice  
 Strengthen and support existing European networks dealing with immovable heritage 
 Carry out specific agreed actions (e.g. formulating harmonised heritage indicators to be used at EU level)

Since January 2014, a permanent administrative secretary has been appointed to manage the EHHF Secretariat along with the Troika members. The permanent Secretariat is based in Brussels in the offices of the Flanders Heritage Agency and is funded by annual contributions from the EHHF members as agreed at the meeting in Oslo in May 2013.

Annual Meetings

The European Heritage Legal Forum 
The European Heritage Legal Forum (EHLF) was founded in 2008 following the EHHF annual meeting held in Copenhagen, Denmark. The heads agreed in their Final Statement to the creation of a sub-committee to improve their capacity for early identification of EU legislation which may pose a potential threat to cultural heritage. A forum of legal experts appointed by the national competent authorities was subsequently formed which reports to the EHHF. The mission of the EHLF is to ensure that relevant information on the development and potential consequences of proposed legislation developed by the European Union is circulated in a timely manner to heritage state authorities. In addition to this monitoring task, the EHLF may make recommendations to the EHHF for revised wording of the draft legislation and possible exemptions for cultural heritage.

References

External links 
 EHHF website

International organizations based in Europe
Cultural heritage of Europe
Organizations established in 2006
International organisations based in Belgium